Cara e Coragem is a Brazilian telenovela produced and broadcast by TV Globo, that aired from 30 May 2022 to 13 January 2023. The telenovela is written by Claudia Souto, with the collaboration of Zé Dassilva, Julia Laks, and Isadora Wilkinson. It stars Paolla Oliveira, Marcelo Serrado, and Taís Araújo.

Plot 
Siderúrgica Gusmão develops a secret formula based on magnesium that becomes the target of Leonardo, brother of the company's director, Clarice Gusmão. Stunt performers Pat and Moa are hired by Clarice to find Jonathan Azevedo's formula, and they see in the challenge a chance to keep their financial situations healthy, guaranteed by their work on film sets. Pat is married and the mother of two children, while Moa has been a single father since his separation from Rebeca. Both have a reciprocal passion for each other, but they don't admit their feelings.

Pat and Moa locate the briefcase containing the formula in a cave in a remote forest, but then find out that Clarice has been murdered, and start an investigation to find out who is behind the mysterious crime. They are joined by Italo, Clarice's former security guard with whom she had a relationship, and Rico, one of the partners at the Coragem.com stunt agency. In the search for clues they end up meeting Anita, Clarice's doppelganger.

Cast 
 Paolla Oliveira as Patrícia "Pat" Lima
 Marcelo Serrado as Moacyr "Moa" Figueira
 Taís Araújo as Clarice Gusmão and Anita Lopes
 Paulo Lessa as Ítalo Santana
 Ícaro Silva as Leonardo Gusmão
 Ricardo Pereira as Danilo Bosco
 Mel Lisboa as Regina Costa Gusmão
 Carmo Dalla Vecchia as Alfredo Laes
 Mariana Santos as Rebeca Bosco Levi
 Maria Eduarda de Carvalho as Andrea Pratini
 Guilherme Weber as Jonathan Avezedo
 André Luiz Frambach as Heitor Gabriel Bastos "Rico"
 Vitória Bohn as Lourdes Maria "Lou"
 Bruno Fagundes as Renan
 Leopoldo Pacheco as João Carlos "Joca" Lima
 Stella Maria Rodrigues as Nadir Lima
 Paula Braun as Olívia Rangel
 Kaysar Dadour as Kaká Bezerra
 Claudia Di Moura as Martha Gusmão
 Sérgio Loroza as Vinícius "Vini"
 Kiko Mascarenhas as Bob Wright / Irandir Duarte
 Lucas Lanna as Child Irandir Duarte
 Jeniffer Nascimento as Jéssica Ferreira
 Júlia Lund as Deputy Marcela Alves
 Fernando Caruso as Detective Paulo Arantes
 Rodrigo Fagundes as Armando Azevedo
 Ariane Souza as Margareth
 Amanda Mirasci as Cleide
 Carol Portes as Dalva
 Anselmo Vasconcellos as Milton Figueira 
 Ivone Hoffmann as Adélia Figueira
 Guida Vianna as Dagmar
 Marcelo Valle as Gustavo Souza Bastos
 Raquel Rocha as Teresa "Teca" Bastos
 Gabriela Loran as Luana
 Mika Makino as Ísis Vieira
 Igor Fernandez as Lucas Batista
 Pablo Sanábio as Enzo Barezzi
 Alana Ferri as Márcia
 Rafael Theophilo as Hugo Sá
 Sergio Kauffmann as Detective Jarbas
 João Campos as Ângelo
 Diogo Savala as Batata
 Zecarlos Moreno as Robson
 Alice Camargo as Sofia Lima Laes "Sossô"
 Diogo Caruso as Guilherme "Gui" Lima Laes
 Guilherme Tavares as Francisco Levi Figueira "Chiquinho"

Guest stars 
 Othon Bastos as Deputy Peixoto
 Alejandro Claveaux as Samuel Rezende Silva "Samuca"
 Rafael Cardoso as Rômulo Dias
 Arlete Salles as Judge
 Agatha Moreira as herself
 Rodrigo Simas as himself
 Vanessa Giácomo as herself
 Thiago Fragoso as himself
 Tatá Werneck as herself
 Liniker as herself
 Jade Baraldo as herself

Production 
In September 2019, it was reported that Claudia Souto handed over to TV Globo's management the scripts of the first episodes of the telenovela, then called Amor em Ação (Love in Action). In February 2020, Cara e Coragem was announced as the official title of the telenovela. The following month, Globo indefinitely suspended production of telenovelas due to the COVID-19 pandemic. Souto continued to deliver the scripts for the episodes of the telenovela. In December 2021, part of the cast began preparing for their roles with action stuntmen. In March, filming officially began.

Ratings

References

External links 
 

2022 Brazilian television series debuts
2023 Brazilian television series endings
2022 telenovelas
2020s Brazilian television series
TV Globo telenovelas
Brazilian telenovelas
Portuguese-language telenovelas
Fictional stunt performers
Television series about cults